Djénébou Danté (born 7 August 1989) is a Malian athlete specialising in the sprinting events. She represented her country in the 100 metres at the 2011 World Championships.

She competed in the Women's 400 metres at the 2016 Summer Olympics in Rio de Janeiro. She placed 5th in her heat with a time of 52.85 seconds. She was the flagbearer for Mali during the Parade of Nations. She won the gold medal at the 2017 Francophony Games with the time of 52.23 seconds.

She competed in the women's 100 metres at the 2020 Summer Olympics.

Competition record

Personal bests
Outdoor
100 metres – 11.98 (+0.6 m/s) (Bruay la Buissiere, France 2015)
200 metres – 23.84 (+1.0 m/s) (Bruay la Buissiere, France 2015)
400 metres – 52.16 (Marseille, France 16/07/2017) NR

References

External links
All-Athletics profile

1989 births
Living people
Malian female sprinters
Place of birth missing (living people)
Athletes (track and field) at the 2015 African Games
Athletes (track and field) at the 2016 Summer Olympics
Olympic athletes of Mali
African Games competitors for Mali
Athletes (track and field) at the 2020 Summer Olympics
Olympic female sprinters
21st-century Malian people